Ben Scott may refer to:
 Ben Scott (cricketer)
 Ben Scott (policy advisor)
 Ben Scott (politician)